HumHub is a free and open-source social network software written on top of the Yii PHP framework that provides an easy to use toolkit for creating and launching your own social network.

History 
The platform can be used for internal communication and collaboration that can range from a few users up to huge Intranets that serve companies with hundreds and thousands of employees. The platform was meant to be self-hosted and currently comes with pretty normal requirements, working with most shared hosting environments around. HumHub also supports themes and modules to extend the functionality for almost all requirements.

HumHub was originally developed by zeros+ones, a web agency from Munich and was spun off as an independent company in early 2015.

References 

 Schick und Open Source: Mit HumHub hostest du dir dein Social Intranet selbst. t3n. Published September 6, 2014.
 Stop Digital Chaos: Endlich einfach E-Mail Ordnung, Datenschutz und Zukunftssicherheit. Published June 19, 2015.

External links 
 
 
 

Business software
Collaborative software
Groupware
Social software
Software using the GNU AGPL license